Paulius Valinskas (born 9 December 1995) is a Lithuanian professional basketball player for FMP of the Basketball League of Serbia and the ABA League. He is a 1.91 m (6'3") tall combo guard.

Early career 
During the 2015–16 season with BC Žalgiris-2, Valinskas won the National Basketball League silver medals losing to BC Sūduva in the final. He averaged 14.5 points and 3.2 assists in 29 minutes of action and got the 2015–16 Most Improved Player Award.

Professional career 
After a breakout season with Žalgiris-2, Valinskas was invited into the main Žalgiris team in the summer of 2016. During his first two years, he saw little playing time. In the 2017–18 season, he averaged 4.7 points in the LKL and 2.8 points in the Euroleague. On November 3, 2017, during an away game against CSKA Moscow, Valinskas scored a career high 11 points, making 3 of his 4 three-pointers.

On August 6, 2018, Valinskas was loaned to Lietkabelis Panevėžys. In 55 games played during the season (both in the LKL and the Champions League), Valinskas averaged 11.9 points, 3.3 assists and 2.6 rebounds, shooting 46% from the field overall.

On August 2, 2019, he went on loan to French club Orléans Loiret Basket of the LNB Pro A.

On August 12, 2021, Valinskas signed with Okapi Aalst of the Belgian BNXT League.

On August 4, 2022, he signed a two-year contract for FMP of the Basketball League of Serbia and the ABA League.

References

External links
 Paulius Valinskas at euroleague.net
 Paulius Valinskas at LKL.lt

1995 births
Living people
ABA League players
BC Lietkabelis players
BC Žalgiris players
BC Žalgiris-2 players
Lithuanian expatriate basketball people in Belgium
Lithuanian expatriate basketball people in France
Lithuanian expatriate basketball people in Serbia
Lithuanian men's basketball players
KK FMP players
Okapi Aalstar players
Orléans Loiret Basket players
Point guards
Basketball players from Kaunas